Kotrikadze is a Georgian surname. Notable people with the surname include:

 Ekaterina Kotrikadze (born 1984), Georgian-Russian journalist and media manager
 Sergo Kotrikadze (1936–2011), Georgian-Soviet association footballer

Georgian-language surnames